Jørgen Ørting Jørgensen (1 April 1943 – 28 January 2019) was a Danish footballer who played as a forward for Holbæk B&I and Swedish club Sandvikens IF. He made nine appearances for the Denmark national team from 1966 to 1975.

References

External links
 
 

1943 births
2019 deaths
Footballers from Copenhagen
Danish men's footballers
Association football forwards
Denmark international footballers
Denmark youth international footballers
Denmark under-21 international footballers
Holbæk B&I players
Sandvikens IF players
Danish expatriate men's footballers
Danish expatriate sportspeople in Sweden
Expatriate footballers in Sweden